Warp zone may refer to:

 Warp (video games), a specific area that allow travel between two locations or levels in video games
 Warp Zone (album), a 2000 album by Martyr
 "The Warpzone", a song by Basshunter from The Bassmachine

See also 
 Warp (disambiguation)
 The Warp (disambiguation)